Muad Mohamed Zaki (born 7 April 1982) is one of the founders of the Maldives multi-party democratic system. His from a prominent left-wing political and business family in the Maldives. He migrated to Malaysia with his family in the 1990s after political turmoil in the Maldives that temporarily drove out large private business owners from the country. His father Dato' Mohamed Zaki is a highly respected figure in the Maldives by Presidents and other political figures. The family owns a well-known multinational firm named Nazaki Group of Companies, which pioneered international trade between Malaysia and the Maldives.

Muad began his political activism through his studies on socialism while in the United Kingdom. He was one of the first members of the Maldivian Democratic Party when it was first formed. He also played a big role in communications between the British parliamentarians & European Union to lobby support for the Maldivian opposition party while the party's leader and his relative Mohamed Nasheed was based in Sri Lanka.

Muad was one of the opposition Maldivian Democratic Party members on the streets of Maldives among the hundreds that were brutally cracked down upon by the National Security Service (NSS) during an anti-government demonstration in the Maldives. The demonstration was later known as Black Friday for the people of Maldives.

He suffered multiple injuries and blood loss from the incident. Later, the European Union sent in a fact finding mission to assess the steps to be taken.

The Maldivian Democratic Party proceeded to win the Presidential elections in 2008 with the help of other parties, creating a coalition government for the first time in the country's history. After the change in government, Muad continued promoting human rights and peace for victims of war through social media campaigns with other online peace activists.

His profession and expertise are derived from a number of different fields. He is educated in International Relations & Security in the United Kingdom, a certified E-Commerce consultant, and has over 12 years of experience in the International Shipping & Trading industry based in Malaysia, as well as over five years' experience in the International Tourism sector. He is also known as an Economist and Strategic Analyst on world affairs. His experience and knowledge has helped him gain popularity.

At the end of 2011, he left the Maldivian Democratic Party due to disagreements with what he saw as increased authoritarian policies by President Mohamed Nasheed and few of his close advisors. In early 2012, Muad went on to join the coalition opposition movement in the Maldives against President Nasheed.

The opposition coalition movement was clamped down by the police with orders from the President, which created scuffles between protesters and police forces. As the opposition protest grew larger daily, along with the decision by the country's chief criminal court judge to not accept cases where individuals were arrested without a warrant or reasonable cause, President Nasheed ordered the special forces to arrest the chief judge indefinitely.

Social networks played an important part in mobilizing support against President Nasheed. On 7 February 2012, the Maldives President Nasheed stepped down on a live state-run media, after the police and military joined the protesters and demanded his resignation.

Muad is also an International Coordinator for an NGO called Maldives Unity Association (MUA) which works to assist in the development of local communities.

During the 2013 Presidential Elections, Muad had endorsed two candidates, one from the Progressive Party of Maldives (PPM) and the other from Jumhooree Party (JP); where both parties openly supported a government ruled by a coalition that represented all sides of Maldives society. The presidential election went in favor of Abdulla Yameen from the Progressive Party of Maldives.

Muad is the first politician and businessman from the Maldives to officially meet the representatives from the Muslim Brotherhood & former Member of first-time democratically elected Parliament in Egypt. His message of non-violent solutions to world conflicts under transparent democratic principles supported by International Law, was well received by those figures. On the Middle East crisis, he is also a strong advocate for a two-state solution where Palestinians & Israelis live peacefully side by side.

In the 2018 Presidential Elections, he had stayed neutral from supporting President Yameen, or his opponent Ibrahim Mohamed Solih. However, from his public statements, it seemed to indicate more support towards the winner of the elections, President Ibrahim Mohamed Solih.

Today, Muad Mohamad Zaki is a freelance and independent political consultant who has close relations with all major political parties and politicians in the country. He provides political consultations to government officials and political parties with regard to diplomacy, human rights, counter-terrorism, international relations, and campaign media strategy.

References

External links 
 Asian Human Rights Commission Report on Muad Mohamed Zaki

1982 births
Living people
Maldivian Democratic Party politicians
Maldivian expatriates in the United Kingdom
Maldivian politicians